Charles Calvin French (October 12, 1883 – March 30, 1962) began his major league career at the age of 25 with the Boston Red Sox. He played in 105 games with 377 at bats. He had 78 hits and 20 RBIs with no home runs.

Transaction
May 19, 1910: Purchased by the Chicago White Sox from the Boston Red Sox.

References
Retrosheet
Baseball Reference

Boston Red Sox players
Chicago White Sox players
Major League Baseball second basemen
1883 births
1962 deaths
Baseball players from Indianapolis
Minor league baseball managers
Vincennes Alices players
Evansville River Rats players
Clinton Infants players
Montreal Royals players
Denver Grizzlies (baseball) players
Salt Lake City Skyscrapers players
Denver Bears players
Indianapolis Indians players
Henderson Hens players